Nawaf Bander Nawaf Al-Temyat (born 28 June 1976) is a Saudi Arabian former footballer who played as a midfielder.

Club career

Al-Temyat played his entire club career with Al-Hilal, starting in 1994 before retiring in 2008. In 2000, he was nominated Asian Player of the Year. A series of injuries prevented him from playing between 2001 and 2004. His last game with Al-Hilal was in 2008. He had a retirement match, which was played between Al Hilal club against Italian side Inter Milan in Riyadh, King Fahd International Stadium on 2 January 2010.

Personal life
Al-Temyat studied sports management with CIES and graduated in 2018; he was president of the Saudi Arabian Football Federation between 2018 and 2019.

Career statistics

International

Honours
Al-Hilal
 Saudi Premier League : 1996, 1998, 2002, 2005, 2008
 Crown Prince Cup : 2000, 2003, 2006
 Saudi Federation Cup : 1996, 2000, 2006
 Saudi Founder's Cup : 2000
 AFC Champions League : 2000
 Asian Cup Winners Cup : 1997, 2002
 Asian Super Cup : 1997, 2000
 Arab Cup Winners' Cup : 2000
 Arab Super Cup : 2001
 Gulf Club Champions Cup : 1998

Saudi Arabia
 AFC Asian Cup
 Runners-up (1) : 2000
 Arab Nations Cup
 Winners (1) : 1998

Individual
 Asian Footballer of the Year: 2000
 Arab Footballer of the Year: 2000

References

External links

 

1976 births
Living people
Saudi Arabian footballers
Saudi Arabia international footballers
1998 FIFA World Cup players
1999 FIFA Confederations Cup players
2002 FIFA World Cup players
2006 FIFA World Cup players
2000 AFC Asian Cup players
Al Hilal SFC players
Asian Footballer of the Year winners
Association football midfielders
Saudi Professional League players
Sportspeople from Riyadh